Llopis is a Catalan surname; a variant of the Spanish patronymic, Lopez. Notable people with the surname include:

Frank Llopis (1916-2012) Musician and founder of Los Llopis
Carlos Llopis (1913–1970), Spanish dramatist
Diego Llopis (1929–2013), Spanish footballer
Francesca Llopis (born 1956), Spanish artist
Jorge Llopis (1919–1976), Spanish satirist, actor and playwright
José Llopis Corona (1918–2011), Spanish footballer
Rafael Llopis (born 1933), Spanish psychiatrist, writer and translator
Rodolfo Llopis (1895–1983), Spanish politician
Salvador Llopis (1950–2014), Spanish footballer
Sergio Llopis (born 1978), Spanish badminton player